Oneonta Armory is a historic National Guard armory building located at Oneonta in Otsego County, New York, built in 1905 with a brick and stone castle-like structure. It was designed by State architect George L. Heins. It consists of a two-story administration building with an attached drill shed.  The building features a 5-story octagonal tower at the southwest corner and a -story square tower at the northwest corner.

It was listed on the National Register of Historic Places in 1995.

References

Armories on the National Register of Historic Places in New York (state)
Infrastructure completed in 1905
Buildings and structures in Otsego County, New York
National Register of Historic Places in Otsego County, New York
1905 establishments in New York (state)